The LG V series is a line of high-end Android devices produced by LG Electronics. This series is slated above the LG G series. The first phone in the V series, the LG V10, was unveiled in September 2015, the first smartphone to have the multiples of 10.

Phones

LG V10 

LG announced the V10 smartphone in September 2015. It features a secondary display above the main screen, as well as two 5MP front-facing cameras (the secondary being 120° wide angle). Introducing a fingerprint sensor and home button combination as well as a leather back, it also includes comprehensive manual photo and video modes for advanced and quick editing while on the move.

 Display: 5.7" IPS LCD with 1440x2560 pixel resolution (main); 2.1" display with 160x1040 pixel resolution (secondary)
 Processor: Qualcomm Snapdragon 808
 Storage: 64 GB (expandable)
 RAM: 4 GB LPDDR3
 Sound: Sabre ES9018 32-bit Hi-Fi DAC
 Battery: 3000 mAh (removable)
 Colors: Space Black, Opal Blue

LG V20 

LG announced the V20 smartphone on September 6, 2016. Like its predecessor, it features a secondary display above the main screen while also being MIL-STD-810G drop compliant with its thin aluminium back. Though no longer having dual front-facing cameras, the LG V20 gains an 8 MP, 135° wide angle secondary rear camera over the V10 while maintaining the less common features such as an IR blaster, FM radio, high fidelity 24-bit dedicated audio recorder and microSD card slot in line with the professional use case of the LG V series.

 Display: 5.7" IPS LCD with 1440x2560 pixel resolution (main); 2.1" display with 160x1040 pixel resolution (secondary)
 Processor: Qualcomm Snapdragon 820
 Storage: 64 GB (expandable)
 RAM: 4 GB LPDDR4
 Sound: Sabre ES9218 32-bit Hi-Fi Quad DAC, tuned by Bang & Olufsen in all regions except North America
 Battery: 3200 mAh (removable)
 Colors: Titan, Pink, Silver

LG V30 

LG announced the V30 series, consisting of the LG V30 and LG V30+, on August 31, 2017. It forgoes the V20's secondary display for an 18:9 near bezeless screen and forgoes the removable battery in favor of IP68 waterproofing and a wireless charging glass design. Compared to the V20, the second screen was replaced with a software floating bar. The only difference between the standard LG V30 and the LG V30+ is the fact that the LG V30+ has 128 GB of storage, while the LG V30 has 64 GB.

 Display: 6" 18:9 POLED with 1440×2880 pixel resolution, DCI-P3 FullVision
 Processor: Qualcomm Snapdragon 835
 Storage: 64 GB (LG V30); 128 GB (LG V30+); both are expandable
 RAM: 4 GB LPDDR4X
 Sound: Sabre ES9218P 32-bit Hi-Fi Quad DAC, tuned by Bang & Olufsen
 Battery: 3300 mAh (non-removable)
 Colors: Aurora Black, Cloud Silver, Moroccan Blue, Lavender Violet, and Raspberry Rose

LG V30S ThinQ 
In February 2018, LG announced an update to the LG V30, the LG V30S ThinQ, which marks the first phone with the ThinQ branding. The phone's hardware is similar to that of the LG V30, with the main differences being in storage, RAM, and color options. The LG V30S ThinQ also contains a number of new software features.

 Processor: Qualcomm Snapdragon 835
 Storage: 128 GB (LG V30S); 256 GB (LG V30S+); both are expandable
 RAM: 6 GB
 Battery: 3300 mAh (non-removable)
 Colors: New Platinum Grey and New Moroccan Blue

LG V35 ThinQ 
A new addition to the LG V30 series, the LG V35 ThinQ was released in May 2018. The phone contains most of the build and design of the LG V30 with the addition of upgraded hardware, listed below:

 Processor: Qualcomm Snapdragon 845
 Storage: 64 GB; expandable
 RAM: 6 GB
 Battery: 3300 mAh (non-removable)
 Camera - Front: 8 MP, f/1.9 (versus 5 MP, f/2.2 on the LG V30S)
 Camera - Rear: 16 MP 107° secondary wide angle, f/1.9 (versus 13 MP 120° secondary wide angle, f/1.9 on the LG V30S)
 Sound: Same ESS Technology Hi-Fi DAC as the V30S plus the inclusion of DTS:X 3D Surround Sound software option
 Colors: Aurora Black, Platinum Grey

LG V40 ThinQ 

On September 27, 2018, LG Mobile Global posted on their YouTube Channel about the design video teaser of the upcoming LG V40 ThinQ. The teaser teased with the phrase "Take 5", hinting that the phone will have 5 cameras altogether (a first for LG), a soft, silky feel ("Silky Blast"), and a selection of colors like Moroccan Blue and Aurora Black. On October 3, 2018, LG officially announced the LG V40 ThinQ in New York City alongside the LG Watch W7 hybrid watch. This phone released on October 18, 2018.

The dual selfie cameras, a feature introduced on the V10, return on the V40 ThinQ, and are housed within the "notch".

Key Specifications

OS: Android 8.1 (Oreo)
Display: 6.4" 19.5:9 QHD+ OLED FullVision (3120 x 1440 resolution / 538ppi / HDR10)
 Processor: Qualcomm Snapdragon 845 Octa-Core processor
 Storage: 128GB (expandable up to 2TB)
 RAM: 6GB LPDDR4X
Network: LTE-A 4 Band CA
Connectivity: Wi-Fi 802.11a/b/g/n/ac, Bluetooth 5.0 BLE, NFC, USB Type-C 2.0 (3.1 compatible)
 Sound: Sabre ES9218P 32-bit Hi-Fi Quad DAC, smartphone speakers tuned by Meridian Audio, Boombox Speaker, DTS:X 3D Surround Sound
 Battery: 3300mAh (non-removable)
 Colors: New Moroccan Blue, New Aurora Black, New Platinum Gray, Carmine Red
Build protection: MIL-STD 810 drop compliant, IP68 dust and water resistant

Photography
 Three rear cameras 
16 MP super wide-angle (f1.9 / 1.0μm / 107°)
12 MP standard angle (f1.5 / 1.4μm / 78°)
12 MP telephoto zoom (f2.4 / 1.0μm / 45°)
Two front cameras 
8 MP standard angle (f1.9 / 1.12μm / 80°)
5 MP wide-angle (f2.2 / 1.12μm / 90°)
Front cameras can work in tandem to create the perfect bokeh effect with an on-screen slider to adjust the amount of background blur. Other features allow selfie lovers to personalize their photos even more with unique lighting and special effects. 
Camera modes:
Triple Shot: Easily capture three photos - standard, telephoto zoom, and super wide-angle - with just one click.
Cine Shot: Control what moves. Transform your snapshots into "living" photos that grab and hold attention. 
AI Assistant: ThinQ AI recognizes what you're shooting and suggest the best filter, while AI composition adjusts the position of your subject for artistically balanced photos.
3D Light Effect: Changes the tone of a photo with professional-looking lighting, touch up any selfie with different looks using Makeup Pro.
Custom Backdrop: Entirely change the background of a selfie.
AR Emoji and Avatars: For those who love all things augmented reality, create and share personalized emojis using one's own face or one of the provided characters.

LG V50-V50s ThinQ

LG announced the V50 ThinQ on 24 February 2019 and the V50s in October 2019 at MWC 2019. The V50-S is largely identical to the V40 externally, albeit with a flush rear camera similarly to the LG G8 and a 5G logo. It features a Qualcomm Snapdragon 855 system-on-chip and Adreno 640 GPU, as well as 5G support and a slightly larger battery. To compete with folding smartphones, the device offers a case accessory known as "LG DualScreen", which contains a second, 6.2-inch 1080p display panel. It is powered using pogo pin connectors on the phone, but communicates wirelessly.

LG V60 ThinQ

Comparison

See also 
 LG G series
 LG Q series
 LG K series

References

Android (operating system) devices
LG Electronics mobile phones
Mobile phones introduced in 2015